Viktor Sieger (1843–1905) was an Austrian painter and printmaker.

Life 
Viktor Sieger was born in Vienna on 17 May 1843, or in 1824 according to some sources. He attended the fine arts academies of Vienna and Munich. He was a painter, watercolourist and engraver, notably of genre scenes. He produced 101 oil paintings and over 100 watercolours. He died in Vienna in 1905.

Gallery

References

Sources 

 Beyer, Andreas; Savoy, Bénédicte; Tegethoff, Wolf, eds. "Sieger, Viktor". In Allgemeines Künstlerlexikon - Internationale Künstlerdatenbank - Online. K. G. Saur. Retrieved 9 October 2022.
 "Sieger, Viktor". Benezit Dictionary of Artists. 2011. Oxford Art Online. Retrieved 7 October 2022.

1843 births
1905 deaths
19th-century Austrian painters